Ahrens Aircraft Corporation was an aircraft manufacturer established at Oxnard, California in 1975 to develop a STOL regional airliner and cargo aircraft, the AR 404. The firm secured a deal with the Government of Puerto Rico to assist with development costs if the aircraft could be produced there. A prototype was actually constructed in that country, and plans were underway to build a factory at Ramey, Puerto Rico, but financial backing was withdrawn and the project was abandoned.

Aircraft
1974 Ahrens AR 124
1976 Ahrens AR 404

References
 

Defunct aircraft manufacturers of the United States